Louise Hawes is an American academic and author of more than a dozen novels and several short story collections. She has served as Writer in Residence at the University of New Mexico and The Women's University of Mississippi, and as a John Grisham Visiting Writer at the University of Mississippi. She has been a guest lecturer at the University of South Florida, Staten Island College, the University of North Carolina at Chapel Hill, the University of North Carolina at Charlotte, Meredith College, and Duke University.

Winner of the New Jersey Author’s Award and two fellowships from the New Jersey Council on the Arts, Hawes helped found the nation's only MFA Program in Writing for Children and Young Adults at Vermont College, and currently teaches  on the faculty there. Her appearances as guest author, lecturer, and teacher have included sessions for the American Library Association, the National Council of Teachers of English, Associated Writing Programs, and the U.S. Department of Education.

Works include:
Big Rig (Peachtree Books, 2022), a novel for middle-grade readers, featuring a protagonist who insists on a story that never ends
The Language of Stars (Simon & Schuster, 2016), a novel written in three formats: prose, poetry, and play scripts
A Flight of Angels (DC Comics/Vertigo, 2011), a graphic novel for adults, written in collaboration with Holly Black, Bill Willingham, et al.; illustrated by Rebecca GuayBlack Pearls, a Faerie Strand (Houghton Mifflin, 2008), a collection of dark fairy tales for adults; illustrated by Rebecca GuayAnteaters Don't Dream (University Press of Mississippi, 2007), a story collection for adults – featured in NC Literary Review 2008
The Vanishing Point (Houghton Mifflin, 2005) – nominated for the 2006 YA Best Books of the Year list, a Bank Street College pick, and a Booksense Independent Booksellers Association choice
Waiting for Christopher (Candlewick, 2002) – a New York Public Library Best Book for the Teen Age and the first campus-wide Reading Initiative Novel at the Mississippi University for Women
Rosey in the Present Tense (Walker Books, 2000) – a Children’s Book Council Best Book of the Year and YALSA Popular Paperback

Her short fiction has been included in Prentice Hall's fiction text The Reader Writes the Story (1995), Simon & Schuster's Love and Sex: Ten Stories of Truth (2001), Such a Pretty Face (Abrams, 2007), Be Careful What You Wish For (Scholastic, 2007), and Things I'll Never Say, Short Stories about Our Secret Selves (Candlewick/Walker Books, 2015). Individual stories have also appeared in the journals Other Voices, The Southerner, and Pisgah Review.

See also

List of young adult authors

External links 

 
 Louise Hawes at Facebook
 Louise Hawes at Writers & Illustrators of North Carolina
 

Living people
Year of birth missing (living people)
21st-century American novelists
American women novelists
American children's writers
University of New Mexico faculty
University of Mississippi faculty
Meredith College faculty
American women children's writers
21st-century American women writers
Novelists from Mississippi
American women academics